Alexander Büttner (born 11 February 1989) is a Dutch professional footballer who plays as a left-back for Eerste Divisie club De Graafschap.

Club career

Vitesse
Born in Doetinchem, Büttner began his career with local club VV Doetinchem, but spent his formative years with Ajax before joining Vitesse at the age of 16 in 2005.

After progressing through the ranks at the youth system and reserves, Büttner made his professional debut for Vitesse on 15 March 2008 against Twente after coming on as a substitute for Haim Megrelashvili in the sixth minute following his poor performance. However, after coming on as a substitute for Megrelashvili, he played until he received a straight red card after a second bookable offence, in a 4–3 loss. This turns out to be his only appearance in the 2007–08 season.

In the 2008–09 season, Büttner then made his first start for the club, where he played the whole game, in a 1–1 draw against Sparta Rotterdam on 20 September 2008. Having established himself in the starting eleven, Büttner then scored his first goal for the club in a 3–1 home win over Volendam on 20 December 2008. Although he appeared on the substitute bench as the season progressed, Büttner regained his first team place and went on to score two goals in two matches between 18 April 2009 and 26 April 2009 against AZ and Utrecht. At the end of the season, Büttner went on to make twenty-three appearances and scoring three times in all competitions.

In the 2009–10 season, Büttner signed his contract and continued to be involved in the first team, competing with Jeroen Drost and Gino Felixdaal over the left-back position, although he spent time the first half of the season, coming on as a substitute. Büttner soon managed his left-back position in the first team and went on to score two goals later in the season against Groningen and Roda JC. At the end of the 2009–10 season, Büttner made twenty-nine appearances and scored two times in all competitions.

In the 2010–11 season, Büttner fully established himself as a left back in the first team. His performance soon attracted interests clubs around Europe from Polish clubs Legia Warsaw and Lech Poznań, but the transfer move never happened and because of this, he appeared on the substitute bench since the end of January, as well as, his own injury concerns. He managed to regain his first team place after the failed transfer move and went on to make twenty-five appearances in all competitions. With his contract expiring at the end of the season, the club opened negotiations with Büttner over a new contract. Eventually, Büttner signed a contract extension, keeping him until 2011.

In the 2011–12 season, Büttner started the season well when he set up two goals, in a 2–1 win over Utrecht on 20 August 2011, followed up by scoring his first goal of the season, in a 4–1 loss against Ajax. Three weeks later, on 17 September 2011, Büttner scored his second goal of the season, in a 5–0 win over Roda JC. Throughout the season, he continued to be in a regular first team, playing either left-back and left-midfielder. Because of this, his performance further attracted interests from clubs, such as, Arizona and Twente. It wasn't until on 12 April 2012 when he scored his third goal of the season, in a 3–1 win over VVV-Venlo. On 28 April 2012, Büttner scored a brace, in a 3–2 win over Excelsior. Although he suffered a toe injury in the next game, Büttner returned to the next game from injury in the last game of the season, in a 3–1 loss against Ajax. At the end of the season, Büttner went on to make thirty-nine appearances and scoring five times in all competitions. For his performance, Büttner was voted by the fans as Vitesse player of the year.

On 6 July 2012, Vitesse agreed a fee with Southampton over the transfer of Büttner to the English club, subject to a medical. The proposed move to Southampton was subsequently halted "due to an unspecified 'demand' from an unnamed third party"; this was believed to be a claim for a percentage of the transfer fee.

Manchester United
On 21 August 2012, Büttner signed a five-year contract with Manchester United, where he was given the number 28 shirt.

Büttner made his league debut on 15 September, setting up the second goal and scoring the third, in a 4–0 home win against Wigan Athletic. His performance gained him the man of the match award. On 23 October, he made his UEFA club competition debut in a 3–2 home victory over Braga in the group stage of the 2012–13 UEFA Champions League. On 5 January, Büttner made his FA Cup debut in a 2–2 draw against West Ham United. United went on to win the Premier League and Büttner received a winner's medal by a special dispensation given by the manager. He scored his second goal for Manchester United on the final day of the season in a dramatic 5–5 draw against West Bromwich Albion. After collecting a pass from Tom Cleverley in the inside left channel, he drove into the penalty area and fired a low shot into the far corner. Büttner said he credited his girlfriend and brother with helping him overcome homesickness.

In the 2013–14 season, Büttner struggled to regain his first-team place in his second season at the club, as France international Patrice Evra was preferred at left-back under the management of David Moyes. In the summer transfer window, he was expected to leave the club on loan to Beşiktaş, but Moyes blocked the move from happening. Büttner then made his first appearance of the season on 25 September 2013, playing at left-back in a 1–0 win over Liverpool in the second round of League Cup. It wasn't until late-March when Büttner had a handful of first team appearances following Evra's injury. Büttner's performance even earned praises from Evra. By the end of the 2013–14 season, Büttner had made 15 appearances for the club in all competitions.

Dynamo Moscow

On 24 June 2014, citing a lack of playing time and a personal rift between himself and United coach Louis van Gaal, Büttner announced that he was leaving Manchester United for Dynamo Moscow, on a three-year deal for £4.4 million potentially rising to £5.6 million. 

Büttner made his Dynamo Moscow debut, where he made his first start for the club, in a 1–1 draw against Hapoel Ironi Kiryat Shmona in the first leg of the third round of the UEFA Europa League and went through to next round after winning 2–1 on aggregate in the second leg. Days later, he made his league debut for the club, in the opening game of the season, in a 7–3 win over Rostov. Weeks later on 21 August 2014, he scored his first goal for Dynamo Moscow in a 2–2 draw against Cypriot club Omonia in the Europa League. Büttner, however, was sent-off in the UEFA Europa League match against Anderlecht after receiving a second bookable offence, in a 0–0 draw. Later in the season, he received a red card again for a second time this season on 24 May 2015, in a 2–2 draw against Arsenal Tula. In his first season at the club, Büttner made thirty-one (19 in the league) and scoring once in all competitions.

In his second season at Dynamo Moscow, however, Büttner suffered an injury at the start of the season. He then made his return to the first team from injury, in a 1–1 draw against Lokomotiv Moscow. However, this turns out to be his only appearance, as he suffered injuries by the first half of the season.

Following his loan spell at Anderlecht came to an end, Büttner expressed desire to leave the club in the summer transfer window, with clubs around Europe keen on signing him, but stayed at the club throughout the summer. Despite this, he returned to the first team and was given a number twenty-four shirt. Büttner made his first appearance for the club in a year on 12 October 2016, where he played the whole game, in a 0–0 draw against Khimki. In December 2016, with four appearances this season, Büttner was released by the club, in the wake of the club's financial difficulties. After leaving the club, Büttner reflected his time at the club, stating that he enjoyed his first season at the club, but became disillusioned in his latter career there, citing the departure of the club's president, Boris Romanovich Rotenberg, and players subsequently left the club as a result.

Loan to Anderlecht
On 1 February 2016, he agreed to join Belgian side Anderlecht on loan until the end of 2015/16 season. It came after when his agent hinted his departure from Dynamo Moscow in the January transfer window.

On 5 February 2016, Büttner made his Anderlecht debut in a 2–2 draw with KV Mechelen, featuring for the entire 90 minutes. A week later, Büttner went onto score his first goal for Anderlecht, netting the second in the Belgian side's 3–0 victory over Zulte Waregem. In a match against Kortrijk on 13 March 2016, Büttner set up two goals, in a 3–0 win. Later in the 2015–16 season, Büttner became a first team regular at the club, but was unsuccessful to win the league, as they finished second place. At the end of the 2015–16 season, making 16 appearances and scoring once in all competitions, Büttner returned to his parent club after Anderlecht decided against signing him on a permanent basis.

Return to Vitesse
On 16 January 2017, Büttner returned to Vitesse, signing a 2.5-year contract with the club. Upon re-joining the club, he was a replacement for Kosuke Ota, who returned to FC Tokyo.

Büttner made his second Vitesse debut on 19 February 2017, where he came on as a second-half substitute, in a 1–0 loss against Ajax.

He left Vitesse in July 2019 upon the expiration of his contract.

New England Revolution
On 1 November 2019, Büttner joined Major League Soccer side New England Revolution for the 2020 season. On 20 January 2021, New England and Büttner mutually agreed to terminate his contract.

RKC Waalwijk
In July 2021, Büttner joined Eredivisie side RKC Waalwijk for the 2021–22 season.

De Graafschap
On 28 April 2022, De Graafschap signed Büttner to a three-year deal.

International career
Büttner has represented the Netherlands at under-20 and under-21 levels.

On 7 May 2012, Büttner was named in the provisional list of 36 players for the UEFA Euro 2012 tournament, one of nine uncapped players to be chosen by Netherlands manager Bert van Marwijk as part of the preliminary squad. However, Büttner was among seven players to be cut from the squad after van Marwijk reduced his squad to 27 players on 15 May 2012. Two years after being cut from the squad, Büttner expressed hope he would be called up by the national team one day, but this never happened.

Personal life
Born in Doetinchem, Netherlands, Büttner grew up in a football-loving family. Like Büttner himself, his two brothers and father are also footballers. Growing up, Büttner revealed that his father was very strict on him. He is the cousin of fellow footballer Giovanni Büttner.

Career statistics

.

Honours
Manchester United
Premier League: 2012–13

Vitesse
KNVB Cup: 2016–17

References

Notes

External links 

 
Netherlands youth stats at OnsOranje

1989 births
Living people
People from Doetinchem
Dutch people of German descent
Association football fullbacks
Association football midfielders
Dutch footballers
Netherlands youth international footballers
Netherlands under-21 international footballers
SBV Vitesse players
Manchester United F.C. players
FC Dynamo Moscow players
R.S.C. Anderlecht players
New England Revolution players
RKC Waalwijk players
De Graafschap players
Eredivisie players
Premier League players
Russian Premier League players
Belgian Pro League players
Major League Soccer players
Expatriate footballers in England
Expatriate footballers in Russia
Expatriate footballers in Belgium
Expatriate soccer players in the United States
Dutch expatriate sportspeople in England
Dutch expatriate sportspeople in Russia
Dutch expatriate sportspeople in the United States
Footballers from Gelderland